Frank Saunders may refer to:

 Frank Saunders (footballer) (1864–1905), English footballer
 Frank Saunders (rugby league) (1902–1978), Australian rugby league player
 Frank Saunders (athlete) (1899–1992), British long-distance runner
 Frank Saunders, American schoolteacher and congressional candidate in Georgia